Anna Karolína Schmiedlová was the defending champion, but she chose not to participate.

Danka Kovinić won the title, defeating Margarita Gasparyan in the final, 7–5, 6–3.

Seeds

Main draw

Finals

Top half

Bottom half

References 
 Main draw

Empire Slovak Open - Singles